Fossemagne is a commune in the Dordogne département in Nouvelle-Aquitaine in southwestern France.

Population

See also
Communes of the Dordogne department

References

External links

 Location of Fossemagne in the map of France

Communes of Dordogne